Live in Paris 1975 is a live album by the British hard rock band Deep Purple, recorded in 1975 at the Palais des Sports in Paris. It was meant to be released before the 1975 Come Taste the Band album, but was not released until 2001 by Purple Records.

In early 1975, the guitarist Ritchie Blackmore recorded his first album, Ritchie Blackmore's Rainbow with Rainbow and decided to leave Deep Purple. This made the band's show in Paris on 7 April 1975 a historic moment in their long career, marking Blackmore's final appearance with the band until the band reformed in 1984.

The set took in tracks from Burn, Stormbringer and Machine Head/Made in Japan, and featured the band's Mk III line up for the last time. It was also the last time Deep Purple ever played the songs "The Gypsy", "Lady Double Dealer", "Mistreated" and "You Fool No One" live, though Rainbow and Whitesnake have played "Mistreated" in concert, and Whitesnake has played "Lady Double Dealer" on their early concerts.

In 2012, a double CD entitled Paris 1975 was released. This has the same tracks, with an added near-half-hour interview with Coverdale, Hughes and Paice, but there is an edit on the introduction of "Burn" (minus 1 minute)

Track listing
Disc One
"Burn" (Ritchie Blackmore, David Coverdale, Jon Lord, Ian Paice) – 9:46
"Stormbringer" (Blackmore, Coverdale) – 5:12
"The Gypsy" (Blackmore, Coverdale, Glenn Hughes, Lord, Paice) – 6:11
"Lady Double Dealer" (Blackmore, Coverdale) – 4:35
"Mistreated" (Blackmore, Coverdale) – 12:49
"Smoke on the Water" (Blackmore, Ian Gillan, Roger Glover, Lord, Paice) – 11:10
"You Fool No One" (Blackmore, Coverdale, Lord, Paice) – 19:30

Disc Two
"Space Truckin'" (Blackmore, Gillan, Glover, Lord, Paice) – 21:21
"Going Down" (Don Nix) – 5:19
"Highway Star" (Blackmore, Gillan, Glover, Lord, Paice) – 11:33

2003 & 2008 Japanese Papersleeve Release
Disc One
"Introduction"　 – 1:54
"Burn" (Ritchie Blackmore, David Coverdale, Jon Lord, Ian Paice) – 7:50
"Stormbringer" (Blackmore, Coverdale) – 5:12
"The Gypsy" (Blackmore, Coverdale, Glenn Hughes, Lord, Paice) – 6:11
"Lady Double Dealer" (Blackmore, Coverdale) – 4:35
"Mistreated" (Blackmore, Coverdale) – 12:49
"Smoke on the Water" (Blackmore, Ian Gillan, Roger Glover, Lord, Paice) – 11:10
"You Fool No One" (Blackmore, Coverdale, Lord, Paice) – 13:30

Disc Two
"Space Truckin'" (Blackmore, Gillan, Glover, Lord, Paice) – 21:21
"Going Down" (Don Nix) – 5:19
"Highway Star" (Blackmore, Gillan, Glover, Lord, Paice) – 11:33

2012 Deep Purple (Overseas) Live Series
Disc One
"Burn" (Ritchie Blackmore, David Coverdale, Jon Lord, Ian Paice) – 8:37
"Stormbringer" (Blackmore, Coverdale) – 5:15
"The Gypsy" (Blackmore, Coverdale, Glenn Hughes, Lord, Paice) – 6:08
"Lady Double Dealer" (Blackmore, Coverdale) – 4:26
"Mistreated" (Blackmore, Coverdale) – 12:57
"Smoke on the Water" (Blackmore, Ian Gillan, Roger Glover, Lord, Paice) – 10:23
"You Fool No One" (Blackmore, Coverdale, Lord, Paice) – 19:27

Disc Two
"Space Truckin'" (Blackmore, Gillan, Glover, Lord, Paice) – 21:24
"Going Down" (Don Nix) – 5:17
"Highway Star" (Blackmore, Gillan, Glover, Lord, Paice) – 11:35
"1975 Interview With David Coverdale, Glenn Hughes & Ian Paice" – 23:19

Personnel
Deep Purple
Ritchie Blackmore – guitar
David Coverdale – lead vocals
Glenn Hughes – bass guitar, lead vocals, backing vocals
Jon Lord – organ, keyboards, backing vocals
Ian Paice – drums, percussion

References

External links
http://www.purplerecords.net
http://www.deep-purple.net/review-files/paris75/paris75.htm

1975 live albums
Deep Purple live albums